The Los Indios Port of Entry opened in 1992 with the completion of the Free Trade International Bridge in 1992.  The crossing handles both passenger vehicles and commercial trucks.  Because of the length of the bridge and the rural location, there are very few pedestrians.  The Bridge is owned jointly by Cameron County and the cities of Harlingen and San Benito.  For many years, Los Indios was the sole port of entry for transmigrantes transporting goods from the United States to Latin America.

References

See also

 List of Mexico–United States border crossings
 List of Canada–United States border crossings

Mexico–United States border crossings
1992 establishments in Texas
Transport infrastructure completed in 1992
Buildings and structures in Cameron County, Texas